The Flag Lieutenant is a 1932 British war film based on the play by William Price Drury and directed by and starring Henry Edwards, Anna Neagle, Joyce Bland, and Peter Gawthorne. The film's plot involves a lieutenant who is wrongly accused of cowardice.

Production
The film was made at British and Dominions Imperial Studios, Elstree. It is based on the play of the same title which had previous been adapted into films in 1919 and 1927. The film provided an early leading role for Neagle, who was under contract to the producer Herbert Wilcox and would later become his wife.

Cast
 Henry Edwards as Lieutenant Dicky Lascelles
 Anna Neagle as Hermione Wynne
 Joyce Bland as Mrs Cameron
 Peter Gawthorne as Major Thesiger
 Louis Goodrich as Admiral Wynne
 Sam Livesey as Colonel McLeod
 Michael Hogan as Lieutnenat Palliser
 O. B. Clarence as General Gough-Bogle
 Abraham Sofaer as Meheti Salos
 Peter Northcote as Midshipman Lee
 Tully Comber as Midshipman Hood

References

Bibliography
 Low, Rachael. Filmmaking in 1930s Britain. George Allen & Unwin, 1985.
 Wood, Linda. British Films, 1927-1939. British Film Institute, 1986.

External links

1932 films
British war films
1932 war films
Films directed by Henry Edwards
British films based on plays
British black-and-white films
British and Dominions Studios films
Films shot at Imperial Studios, Elstree
1930s English-language films
1930s British films